The members of the 8th General Assembly of Newfoundland were elected in the Newfoundland general election held in May 1861. The general assembly sat from 1861 to 1865.

Hugh Hoyles, leader of the Conservative Party, had been appointed premier and invited to form a government in March after his predecessor was dismissed by the governor. Hoyle's government was defeated in a non-confidence vote prompting a general election in May which Hoyles and his party won, allowing Hoyles to continue as Newfoundland's premier until March 1865, when he accepted a post on the Newfoundland Supreme Court. Frederick Carter succeeded Hoyles as party leader and premier. Carter formed a coalition government with Liberals Ambrose Shea and John Kent.

Frederick Carter was chosen as speaker, serving until April 1865, when William Whiteway became speaker.

Sir Alexander Bannerman served as colonial governor of Newfoundland until 1864. Sir Anthony Musgrave succeeded Bannerman as governor.

Frederick Carter and Ambrose Shea represented Newfoundland at the 1864 Quebec Conference on Canadian Confederation.

Members of the Assembly 
The following members were elected to the assembly in 1861:

Notes:

By-elections 
By-elections were held to replace members for various reasons:

Notes:

References 

Newfoundland
008